For Those Who Wait is the fourth full-length studio album released by Christian rock band Fireflight. The album was released on February 9, 2010 on Flicker Records.

Release and promotion
On February 2, 2010 until the release of the album, Fireflight posted their lead track, "For Those Who Wait", for free to download on Amiestreet.

For Those Who Wait was released on February 9, 2010. It peaked at No. 5 on the Billboard Top Christian Albums chart, No. 16 Alternative Albums and No. 96 on the Billboard 200. It was their highest CD on the chart, selling over 15,000 copies in its first week.

The Japanese bonus track, "Proof of Our Love", was given out to fans via e-mail on February 9, 2010. The website for the promotion, titled "For Those Who Waited", ended and the site address is now defunct.

The album received largely favorable reviews. The band toured in late 2010 on the For Those Who Wait Tour with Group 1 Crew and Manic Drive in support of the album.

On December 1, 2010, it was announced that For Those Who Wait had been nominated for a Grammy in the Best Rock or Rap Gospel Album category, marking Fireflight's first Grammy nomination. It lost to Switchfoot's Hello Hurricane.

Track listing

References
Fireflight albums
2010 albums